James Blake was the defending champion, but lost in the first round to Fabrice Santoro.

Dmitry Tursunov won in the final 7–6(7–3), 7–6(7–4), against Chris Guccione.

Seeds

Draw

Finals

Top half

Bottom half

External links
 Main Draw
 Qualifying Draw

Medibank International Men's Singles
Men's Singles